The Apeldoorn–Deventer railway is an important railway in the Netherlands, running from Apeldoorn, Gelderland to Deventer, Overijssel. The line was opened between 1887 and 1888. It is used by long-distance trains from Amsterdam, Rotterdam and The Hague towards Enschede and Berlin, and by local services between Apeldoorn and Enschede.

Stations
The main interchange stations on the Apeldoorn–Deventer railway are:

Apeldoorn: to Amersfoort, Amsterdam and Zutphen
Deventer: to Zwolle, Almelo and Arnhem

Railway lines in the Netherlands
Railway lines opened in 1888
1888 establishments in the Netherlands
Railway lines in Gelderland
Railway lines in Overijssel
Standard gauge railways in the Netherlands
19th-century architecture in the Netherlands